Scott Brian Fletcher (born July 30, 1958), is a former professional baseball player who played shortstop and second base in Major League Baseball from 1981 to 1995. Fletcher is related to Michael Barrett, who also played for the Chicago Cubs.  Fletcher graduated from Wadsworth High School in Wadsworth, Ohio in 1976.

Playing career
Fletcher was signed by the Chicago Cubs in the 1979 amateur draft and made his major league debut with the team in 1981. After two years in a limited role, the Cubs traded Fletcher to their intercity rival, the Chicago White Sox in 1983. With the emergence of Ozzie Guillén in 1985, Fletcher was traded to the Texas Rangers at the end of the 1985 season. In  he hit .300 (15th best in the American League) for the Rangers and was named the American League Player of the Month for July. In 1988, Fletcher became the first professional athlete in the Dallas/Fort Worth area to earn more than $1 million a year. After a slow start to the 1989 season, which saw him bat only .239 through 83 games, Fletcher was traded back to the Chicago White Sox at the trade deadline. Fletcher would split the remaining seasons of his career with the White Sox, Milwaukee Brewers, Boston Red Sox, and Detroit Tigers. He retired in 1995.
 
When reflecting on Fletcher's playing career, Bill James noted that Fletcher "didn't do anything exceptionally well" and that he mainly "filled a slot", though he ranked him the 85th best shortstop of all time.

Coaching career
After retiring in 1995, Fletcher became the manager for the minor league Charleston RiverDogs in 1997. He later became an assistant coach at Emory University from 1999 to 2004. Fletcher became the Colorado Rockies' infield coordinator in 2009. He was hired as an assistant hitting coach to Greg Walker on October 21, 2011. Fletcher left the Braves at the end of the 2014 season. Scott is currently a minor league instructor for the Detroit Tigers.

Legacy

George W. Bush named his dog Spot Fetcher after Fletcher while Bush was the owner of the Texas Rangers. The dog, an English Springer Spaniel, remained with the Bushes throughout George W. Bush's term as Governor of Texas (1995–2000) but died in 2004 during Bush's first term as US President.

References

External links

Pura Pelota (Venezuelan Winter League)

1958 births
Living people
Atlanta Braves coaches
Baseball players from Florida
Boston Red Sox players
Chicago Cubs players
Chicago White Sox players
Detroit Tigers players
Geneva Cubs players
Georgia Southern Eagles baseball players
Iowa Oaks players
Major League Baseball second basemen
Major League Baseball shortstops
Midland Cubs players
Milwaukee Brewers players
Minor league baseball managers
Navegantes del Magallanes players
American expatriate baseball players in Venezuela
Pawtucket Red Sox players
People from Fort Walton Beach, Florida
People from Wadsworth, Ohio
Texas Rangers players
Toledo Rockets baseball players
Valencia Matadors baseball players